"Playinwitme" is a song by American rapper and singer Kyle featuring fellow American singer Kehlani. The two had previously collaborated on the former's 2015 single "Just a Picture". The song was released for digital download and streaming on March 15, 2018, and serves as the third single from his debut studio album Light of Mine (2018). It was produced by Superduperbrick, Naz, Jake Troth, and M-Phazes.

Remixes
On August 20, 2018, a remix to the song was released featuring Logic. Later on January 8, 2019, another remix was released featuring Jay Park.

Track listing

Credits and personnel
Credits adopted from Tidal

 Kyle – vocals, composition
 Kehlani – vocals, composition
 Jake Troth – composition, production
 Justin Howze – composition
 Joshua Portillo – composition
 Chris Gehringer – master engineering
 William Binderup – master engineering
 Martin Gray – master engineering

 Brian Cruz – master engineering
 Thomas Cullison – master engineering
 Matt Jacobson – master engineering
 Naz – production
 Kyle Harvey – executive production
 M-Phazes – production
 Erik Madrid – mixing

Charts

Weekly charts

Year-end charts

Certifications

Release history

References

2018 songs
Kyle (musician) songs
2018 singles
Kehlani songs
Songs written by Kehlani
Atlantic Records singles